Patsy Healey  (née Ingold; born 1 January 1940) is a British urban planner. She is  professor emeritus at Global Urban Research Unit in the School of Architecture, Planning & Landscape, at Newcastle University. She is a specialist in planning theory and practice, with a particular focus on strategic spatial planning for city regions and in urban regeneration policies. She is Senior Editor of Planning Theory and Practice journal, jointly published by TandF and the RTPI.

She is the daughter of the mycologist Cecil T. Ingold.

Research interests 
She has undertaken research on the preparation and implementation of development plan frameworks, on how planning strategies work out in practice and on partnership forms of governance at the neighbourhood, city and city region scales. Over the years, she has developed approaches to collaborative planning practices, linked to an institutionalist analysis of urban socio-spatial dynamics and urban governance, with books on urban governance and on strategic spatial planning in Europe.

Honours 
 In July 2009, she was awarded Ordinary Fellowship from the British Academy for distinction in Urban planning theory and practice.
 In October 2006, she received Royal Town Planning Institute’s (RTPI) Gold Medal Award on outstanding achievement in the field of town and country planning. Healey was the first woman ever to receive the award in its 53-year history.
 In June 2006, she was made a Fellow of University College, London.
 In 2004, she was recognised as an Honorary Member, by the Association of European Schools of Planning (AESOP), only the second such honour to be awarded.
 In 1999, she was awarded an OBE for services to planning

Memberships 
 Founding Member of Planning and Honorary Member since 2004.
 In UK, member of the ODPM/DCLG Planning Research Network, the Planning Aid Council, the RTPI’s Knowledge and Research Committee.
 Has been member of the ICES-KIS Panel in the Netherlands in 2003
 Since 2004, she has been an adviser to the ODPM/DCLG’s Evaluation Study of the new Local Development Frameworks, (now called Spatial Planning in Practice)
 Member of advisory panel for the ODPM on the evaluation of the Housing Market Renewal Pathfinder Programme.
 On the Advisory Board of SITI, in Turin, Italy, and of CITTA, in the University of Porto, Portugal.

Publications

Books 
 Urban Complexity and Spatial Strategies: a relational planning for our times, Routledge, London, 2006.
 Collaborative Planning: Shaping Places in Fragmented Societies, 2nd Edition, Palgrave Macmillan, 2005.

Journal articles 
 Relational Complexity and the imaginative power of strategic spatial planning, European Planning Studies, 2006, Vol 14 (4), pp 525–246
 Transforming governance: challenges of institutional adaptation and a new politics of space, European Planning Studies, 2006, Vol 14 (3), pp. 299–319

Book chapters 
 Territory, integration and spatial planning, in Tewdwr-Jones, M and Allmendinger P, Territory, Identity and Spatial Planning: spatial governance in a fragmented nation, 2006, London, Routledge, pp. 64–79
 Making Better Places (Planning, Environment, Cities) - The Planning Project in the Twenty-First Century, Palgrave Macmillan, May 2010, 
  
 Communicative Planning: Practices, Concepts and Rhetorics in Sanyal, Bishwapriya, Vale, Lawrence J. and Rosan, Christina D., Planning Ideas that Matter:  Livability, Territoriality, Governance, and Reflective Practice, 2012, Cambridge, MIT Press, pp. 333–358.

See also 
 Association of European Schools of Planning
 Global Urban Research Unit

References

External links 
 Profile at Newcastle University website
 Who's Who Listing

Living people
Academics of Newcastle University
Officers of the Order of the British Empire
Fellows of the British Academy
1940 births
Place of birth missing (living people)
Fellows of the Academy of Social Sciences
British urban planners
Women urban planners